Between the Sheets is the debut and only studio album by British girl group The 411. It was released by Sony Music on 22 November 2004 in the United Kingdom. Between the Sheets was supported by three successful singles, including "On My Knees" featuring Ghostface Killah, "Dumb" and "Teardrops". However, upon release the album failed to match the success of its singles. It charted outside of the UK top 40 and spent just three weeks on the chart, resulting in the group being dropped by Sony.

Critical reception

Kitty Empire from The Guardian found that "the 411's debut album offers up a further array of songs that are either too bland or not quite right. Third single "Teardrops" pivots on the same Lalo Schifrin riff that Portishead lifted, but as atmospheric as it is, it remains a secondhand idea. Between the Sheets isn't dreadful, but it sounds like an opportunity missed. With the Sugababes sick of the sight of each other, they could have cleaned up."

Track listing

Notes
 signifies additional producer
 signifies original producer
Sample credits
"On My Knees" contains a sample from "Ain't My Style," performed by Main ingredient, written by Ed Townsend:
"Teardrops" contains a sample from "Danube Incident," performed by Lalo Schiffrin.
"Jumpin" contains a sample from "Feel Like Jumping," written by Clement Dadd and Marcia Griffin with additional lyrics by Matt Rowe.

Charts

References 

2004 debut albums
Contemporary R&B albums by English artists
Sony Music albums